Peace – Burial at Sea is a painting in oils on canvas by the English Romantic artist J. M. W. Turner (1775–1851), first exhibited in 1842. The work is a memorial tribute to Turner's contemporary the Scottish painter Sir David Wilkie (1786–1841). The canvas depicts Wilkie's burial at sea. This work was intended as a companion piece to War. The Exile and the Rock Limpet (also 1842) which alludes to the sordid demise of the former Emperor of France Napoleon Bonaparte (thus "War" and "Peace"). The two works are characterized by sharply contrasting colors and tones: War utilizes a strident yellow and red while Peace is painted a cool blend of white, blue and black. 

The work was part of the Turner bequest gifted by the artist to the British nation in 1859 and is now in the permanent collection of Tate Britain.

In popular culture
The post-hardcore British band Peace Burial at Sea takes its name from the painting.

See also
 List of paintings by J. M. W. Turner

References

External links
 

1842 paintings
Maritime paintings
Paintings by J. M. W. Turner
Collection of the Tate galleries